The Virgin and Child (La S. Vergine con il Bambino) is an Italian wall painting by Antonio Filocamo, in Palermo Cathedral in Sicily. It was painted around the 1690s, but uses the gold background more characteristic of medieval paintings.

1690s paintings
Italian paintings
Paintings of the Madonna and Child
Paintings in Palermo